Fustvatnet is a lake that lies in the municipality of Vefsn in Nordland county, Norway. The European route E6 highway follows the northwestern coastline.

See also
 List of lakes in Norway
 Geography of Norway

References

Lakes of Nordland
Vefsn